Robuste was an 80-gun  80-gun ship of the line of the French Navy, designed by Jacques-Noël Sané.

She was commissioned under Captain Louis-Antoine-Cyprien Infernet, and was later captained by Julien Cosmao and Antoine Marie François Montalan.

From April 1809, she was the flagship of a squadron.

In late 1809, Vice-Admiral Honoré Joseph Antoine Ganteaume was organising shipment of reinforcements to Barcelona. Robuste became the flagship of a squadron under Julien Cosmao, along with Donawerth, Génois, Borée and Lion, as well as the frigates Pauline and Pénélope, and a dozen of transports. The fleet departed Toulon on 24 April 1809, and returned on 1 May without incident.

In October, the squadron attempted another ferry, under Rear-Admiral François Baudin. On 21 October the French were detected by HMS Pomone, which reported to Lord Collingwood's squadron. Collingwood sent his three frigates as a vanguard and sailed with 15 ships of the line to intercept the French. On the morning of 23 October HMS Volontaire detected and reported the French squadron's position.

The British gave chase, but lost contact.  detected Robuste, Borée, Lion and Pauline at dawn on 24 October, but the fleets lost contact again. Contact was re-established in the morning of 25 October, the French sailing close to the shore, and the chase resumed. In the ensuing Battle of Maguelone, Robuste and Lion ran aground around noon near Frontignan. After two hours of fruitless attempts to save the ships, Baudin ordered them scuttled, and they were set on fire in the evening. They exploded at 10h30.

Citations

References
  William James, The Naval History of Great Britain, from the Declaration of War By France in 1798 to the Accession of George IV p.142
 Jean-Michel Roche, Dictionnaire des Bâtiments de la flotte de guerre française de Colbert à nos jours, tome I

Ships of the line of the French Navy
Bucentaure-class ships of the line
1806 ships
Ships built in France
Maritime incidents in 1809
Ship fires
Scuttled vessels
Shipwrecks in the Mediterranean Sea